Hemus Peak is an ice-covered peak rising to  off the northwest extremity of Bowles Ridge in eastern Livingston Island. Hemus is an ancient name of Stara Planina (Balkan Mountains), the central mountain range separating northern from southern Bulgaria.

Location

Maps
 South Shetland Islands. Scale 1:200000 topographic map. DOS 610 Sheet W 62 60. Tolworth, UK, 1968.
 Islas Livingston y Decepción.  Mapa topográfico a escala 1:100000.  Madrid: Servicio Geográfico del Ejército, 1991.
 L.L. Ivanov. Livingston Island: Central-Eastern Region. Scale 1:25000 topographic map.  Sofia: Antarctic Place-names Commission of Bulgaria, 1996.
 S. Soccol, D. Gildea and J. Bath. Livingston Island, Antarctica. Scale 1:100000 satellite map. The Omega Foundation, USA, 2004.
 L.L. Ivanov et al., Antarctica: Livingston Island and Greenwich Island, South Shetland Islands (from English Strait to Morton Strait, with illustrations and ice-cover distribution), 1:100000 scale topographic map, Antarctic Place-names Commission of Bulgaria, Sofia, 2005
 L.L. Ivanov. Antarctica: Livingston Island and Greenwich, Robert, Snow and Smith Islands. Scale 1:120000 topographic map. Troyan: Manfred Wörner Foundation, 2010.  (First edition 2009. )
 Antarctic Digital Database (ADD). Scale 1:250000 topographic map of Antarctica. Scientific Committee on Antarctic Research (SCAR), 1993–2016.
 A. Kamburov and L. Ivanov. Bowles Ridge and Central Tangra Mountains: Livingston Island, Antarctica. Scale 1:25000 map. Sofia: Manfred Wörner Foundation, 2023.

External links
 Hemus Peak. SCAR Composite Antarctic Gazetteer
 Bulgarian Antarctic Gazetteer. Antarctic Place-names Commission. (details in Bulgarian, basic data in English)

External links
 Hemus Peak. Copernix satellite image

Mountains of Livingston Island